Dhani Bhojraj is a small village in Fatehabad, Haryana, India, with a population of approximately 3,500.[Jhajhra] is the caste mainly found in Dhani Bhojraj. [Chaudhary Manglaram Jhajhra] found this village.  It is mainly dependent on agriculture. It is watered by a canal which passes through the village.

Geography of Haryana
Villages in Fatehabad district